
Gmina Krzykosy is a rural gmina (administrative district) in Środa Wielkopolska County, Greater Poland Voivodeship, in west-central Poland.

Villages
Gmina Krzykosy contains the villages and settlements of Antonin, Baba, Bogusławki, Borowo, Bronisław, Garby, Kaźmierki, Krzykosy, Lubrze, Małoszki, Miąskowo, Młodzikowice, Młodzikówko, Młodzikowo, Murzynowiec Leśny, Murzynówko, Murzynowo Leśne, Pięczkowo, Przymiarki, Solec, Sulęcin, Sulęcinek, Wiktorowo, Wiosna, Witowo and Wygranka.

Neighbouring gminas
Gmina Krzykosy is bordered by the gminas of Książ Wielkopolski, Miłosław, Nowe Miasto nad Wartą, Środa Wielkopolska and Zaniemyśl.

References
Polish official population figures 2006

Krzykosy
Środa Wielkopolska County